Tomáš Janíček (born 7 September 1982) is a retired Czech football player who played as a centre back.

Club career
He began playing at Tescoma Zlin as a nine-year-old. In 2007 a loan deal took him to Nitra in the Corgoň liga. After his return he signed for Mladá Boleslav.

In December 2019, 37-year old Janíček confirmed, that he would retire due to problems with his knee.

References

External links
 
 Guardian Football

1982 births
Living people
Sportspeople from Zlín
Czech footballers
Czech expatriate footballers
Association football defenders
FC Fastav Zlín players
FC Nitra players
FK Mladá Boleslav players
MFK Karviná players
1. SK Prostějov players
Czech First League players
Czech National Football League players
Slovak Super Liga players
Czech expatriate sportspeople in Slovakia
Expatriate footballers in Slovakia